Francis Alan Fitzgerald (born July 16, 1949) is an American musician. A multi-instrumentalist, he is best known as the second bassist of Montrose and as keyboardist for Night Ranger. He has also performed with Gamma, and former Montrose bandmate Sammy Hagar. Fitzgerald also worked as an offstage keyboard player with Van Halen, during their concerts from 1991 until 2004, 2007, 2012.

Discography

with Montrose
Paper Money (1974)
Warner Bros. Presents Montrose! (1975)

with Sammy Hagar
Nine on a Ten Scale (1976)
Sammy Hagar (1977)
All Night Long Live  (1978)

with Ronnie Montrose
Open Fire (1978)

with Gamma
Gamma 1 (1979)

with Night Ranger
Dawn Patrol (1982)
Midnight Madness (1983)
7 Wishes (1985)
Big Life (1987)
Neverland (1997)
Seven (1998)

with Alliance
Alliance (1997)
Missing Piece (1999)
Destination Known (2007)

with Van Halen
Live: Right Here, Right Now (1993)

References 

American rock bass guitarists
American male bass guitarists
American rock keyboardists
Montrose (band) members
Night Ranger members
Living people
1949 births
Place of birth missing (living people)
Sammy Hagar & the Waboritas members
American male guitarists
20th-century American guitarists
21st-century American keyboardists
Gamma (band) members
20th-century American keyboardists